Mehida is a Finnish melodic rock / metal band formed by ex-Sonata Arctica keyboardist Mikko Harkin. Other band members are Markus Niemispelto (drums), Henning Ramseth (guitar), Olli Tanttu (guitar), Toni Mäki-Leppilampi (bass) and Thomas Vikström (Therion, Stormwind, ex-Candlemass) on vocals. Mehida's first album, Blood & Water, was released in Finland on Aug. 22, 2007, in Europe on August 31, 2007 and in the U.S. on September 11, 2007 by Napalm Records. 

During the week of August 27, 2007, Blood & Water hit No. 23 on Finland's top 40 charts.

Discography
 Blood & Water (Napalm, 2007)
 The Eminent Storm (Bullroser Records, 2009)

References

External links
 Official Mehida Website
 Review of Blood&Water at ME Metalhour
 Interview with Mehida at ME Metalhour

Napalm Records artists
Finnish Christian metal musical groups
Finnish progressive metal musical groups